Fars's codes are 63, 73, 83 and 93. 93 was designated to be a reserved code for Shiraz county, Sarvestan County, Kherameh County and Kavar County in case all combinations of the code 63 are exhausted. In public cars, Taxis and Governal cars the letter is always the same. But in simple cars this letter (ب) depends on the city.

63, 93 
63 and starting from March 2013, 93 are Shiraz county, Sarvestan County, Kherameh County and Kavar County's codes and all of the letters are for the mentioned counties

73

83 

Road transport in Iran
Transportation in Fars Province